Disney pin trading is the buying and trading of collectible pins and related items featuring Disney characters, attractions, icons, events and other elements. The practice is a hobby officially supported and promoted by Disney.

Cost
Many thousands of unique pins have been created over the years. Pins are available for a limited time; the base price for a pin is US$9.99. Limited edition pins, and special pins (e.g. pins that have a dangle, pin-on-pin, flocking, lenticular, light-up, moving element, 3-D element, etc.) cost up to $17.99. Featured Artist and Jumbo Pins cost between $20 and $35 and Super Jumbo pins cost upwards of, and sometimes beyond, $125.  Pins are frequently released at special events, movie premiers, pin trading events or to commemorate the opening day of a new attraction. Some pins have appreciated well on the secondary market and have reached prices of over US$2000 at venues such as eBay, though Disney fans debate the ethics of people who buy pins from the parks in bulk and then inflate the price to sell later on platforms like eBay. Most Disney pins are enamel or enamel cloisonné with a metal base. The backs of each pin are very sharp and should be used with care by young collectors.

Pin trading history
Pins have always been present at Disney parks, but it wasn't until 1999 as part of the Millennium Celebration that Disney Pin Trading at the Walt Disney World Resort was introduced. This was following an Odyssey of the Mind function at the resort in which pins were being traded, inspiring the pin trading idea. The next year, the craze spread to the Disneyland Resort, which has become the home of most Pin Trading events but is most popular in Disney World. Since then, Pin Trading has spread to Aulani, Disneyland Paris, Tokyo Disney Resort, Hong Kong Disneyland Resort and Disney Cruise Lines with each location creating their own pins and traditions. Although the trading of pins has been suspended in Tokyo Disney Resort due to pin traders and their pin display mats taking over the park, pins are still offered as prizes at carnival games, and a relatively small number of pins are available.

Current pin trading
In all Disney resorts, a large variety of pins are available for purchase and trade. Most merchandise cast members wear pins on lanyards around their necks, or on a pin display card or hip lanyard – a  piece of colored nylon fabric – clipped to their belt. Additional cast members may wear lanyards if pin trading does not distract from their responsibilities; some managers choose to wear lanyards, but ride operators are not permitted. Some cast members wear a teal colored lanyard at Disneyland and a green lanyard at Walt Disney World with pins tradable to children and adults of all ages.

Each lanyard contains around a dozen unique pins, and cast members must trade with guests if they are presented with an acceptable pin. The cast members may not decline a particular trade based on preference or rarity of the pin but may decline if the pin is not acceptable or pin trading rules are not being observed.

Cast members may have differently colored lanyards that determine what age group can trade for those pins. For example, a green lanyard worn by a cast member means that children twelve years of age and younger only can trade for pins on the lanyard in Walt Disney World Florida. Other than this restriction, people of all ages can enjoy this activity.

Each guest may only trade two pins with the same cast member in one day. If the cast member gives his or her lanyard to a different cast member, a guest may trade again with the new cast member even though the physical lanyard is the same.

The specifics of what make a pin acceptable for trading varies from park to park. At Disneyland and California Adventure parks, the cast members are instructed not to accept pins that have a clasp or brooch-type backing (as with jewelry). This limitation is new as of 2008, and notable because it bars cast members from accepting pins that Disney specifically designed and made in the 1980s. The new rule about the pin backing type is printed on brochures and certain informational boards.

In Disneyland Paris, the cast members are instructed not to accept pins with any of the following origins: Euro Disney, Kodak, Arthus-Bertrand, Disney Store, Spain (also called sedesma pins), or Germany (also called ProPins). This is a partial list of the Disneyland Paris cast member instructions; the full instructions are in French and worn on the cast members' trading lanyards.

Pin collectors can customize displaying their pins because of the wide variety of pin products Disney produces. Lanyards are available in a wide variety of colors and designs as are lanyard medals. There are many ways to store and display a collector's pins: pin bags, notebooks, frames and cork boards. Collectors can be very creative in displaying their pins and are often easy to spot in the parks with their pin-covered vests, hats, lanyards and fanny packs.

Pin etiquette
Disney has published a pamphlet on how to trade pins, and tips on Pin Etiquette. Among these tips include:
 To trade a pin with a Disney cast member, the pin must be made of metal and have a representation of a Disney character, park, attraction, icon, or other official affiliation. Additionally, the pin must have a Disney copyright on its back.
 Guests must trade with Cast Members, one pin at a time, with the pin back in place (pins have functional sharp posts).
 Guests can make up to two pin trades per cast member per day.
 Refrain from touching another person's pins or lanyard, ask to see the pin so they can bring the pin into closer view.
 The pin that is traded to the cast member cannot be a duplicate of any pin they already have on their lanyard.
 No money can change hands on Disney property in exchange for a pin.

Note that this pin etiquette pamphlet is only a partial list of restrictions, and restrictions as indicated in the above section "Current Pin Trading" also exist.

Official Disney pin release locations

There are many official locations where a guest can find Disney pins for purchase.
 Disneyland Resort Anaheim (DLR)
 Disneyland
 Disney's California Adventure
 Downtown Disney Traders
 Walt Disney World (WDW)
 Magic Kingdom
 Epcot
 Disney's Hollywood Studios
 Disney's Animal Kingdom
 Disney Springs
 Disneyland Paris (DLP)
 Disneyland Park
 Walt Disney Studios Park
 Disney Village
 Hotels
 Hong Kong Disneyland Resort (HKDLR)
 Hong Kong Disneyland
 Tokyo Disney Resort
 Disney Cruise Lines
 Walt Disney Studios, Burbank
 Walt Disney Imagineering (WDI)
 Disney Studio Store Hollywood (next to the El Capitan Theatre)

Since 2008, trading pins are no longer sold in stores outside of those located at the theme parks, and are only available through ordering them at the online Disney Store. Disney Shopping has offered limited edition pins on their website since Disney Auctions was closed. Recently, some Disney stores have added open edition pins themed for their location. (Examples include Honolulu, Hawaii and San Francisco, California stores.)

Note: Pin trading is not available in Tokyo Disney Resort. Visitors can only purchase pins in the resort and win them from games.

Pin terms

General
Artist Proof – Artist Proof pins (or AP pins) are created during a manufacturing run to verify quality. AP pins have an AP stamped on their back. Generally 20–24 AP pins are made of each pin per run. Some collectors may value AP pins more than others.
Back Stamp – A pin's back stamp contains information about the pin and can include copyright information and edition size.
Chaser – A pin in a series that is rarer or more difficult to acquire. They can often be colour variants of a known pin.
Cloisonné – A French word meaning "partitioned." It refers to a style of pin in which the surface decoration is set in designated sections, one color at a time. Cloisonné also refers to a pin type in which crushed minerals and pigments are used to create coloring on a pin.
Dangle Pins – Dangle pins have an extension to the base of the pin that dangles (hangs) from one or more small loops or chains.
Die Cast – Die Cast pins are cast from brass zinc alloy using high-quality hand engraved dies which create an eye-catching, three-dimensional image.
Epoxy Coating – Epoxy coating is a glassy, opaque substance used as a decorative or protective coating. When the coating dries, it forms a smooth, glossy surface.
Flocking – A flocked pin has an area that is fuzzy.
Hard Enamel – Hard Enamel is sometimes called the new cloisonné. It not only retains the characteristics of classic cloisonné, but also provides a much wider selection of colors. Just as with cloisonné, each pin is hand-crafted in a process that begins with a flat piece of brass which is die-struck and then filled with enamel colors. The surface is then hand polished to give it a smooth finish.
Lenticular – A Lenticular pin has two or more images that can change when it is tilted back and forth.
Light-Up Pin – A Light-up pin has lights in its design that flash when activated. The Light-up element has been used less in recent years due to difficulties in battery replacement and metal corrosion.
Pre Production/Prototype Pin – Pre Production/Prototype pins (or PP Pins) are received by product developers prior to a pin being manufactured. These pins sometimes contain different coloring, fills or features than the final production pin.  The number depends on what the final product will be, as these pins may be different in size, texture, color, etc.  The developers use these "test" pins to determine what the final product will be. Pin from late 2007 - now will contain a PP stamp on the back. Pins prior to late 2007 may contain a Pro Products label signifying it is a pre production pin. Some pins may contain no identification that it is a pre-production pin at all.
Scrapper Pin – A Scrapper pin is an unauthorized pin.  Many of the molds Disney uses to make pins are not destroyed after the creation of its pin order, and bootlegs are created.  This practice has flooded the Disney parks and secondary markets like eBay with cheap imitations, mostly of Cast lanyard pins and mystery release pins.  Some are sold on eBay or found in the parks before the real pins are even released.
Slider Pin – A Slider pin has a movable piece that slides back and forth across the base of a pin.
Spinner Pin – A Spinner pin has a spinning mechanism that moves a piece of the pin 360 degrees.
Soft Enamel – A soft enamel pin has the design stamped into the base metal. These pins are filled with enamel colors and baked for durability. A final clear epoxy dome is applied to protect the finish. Typically a thinner pin than cloisonné pins.

Exclusive to Disney pin trading
The following terms are specific, specialized terms relating to Disney pin trading:

Build-A-Pin – The Build-A-Pin program was introduced in 2002 and retired in Summer 2004. Guests could personalize pins bases with character add-ons. After selecting their favorite base and add on, the pin was assembled with a special machine.
Continuing the Pin Trading Tradition Pin – Also known as a CTT pin, these annual pins were created for guest recognition by cast members. Guests may be awarded a Continuing The Pin Trading Tradition pin for demonstrating positive Disney Pin Trading etiquette and promoting Disney Pin Trading.
Fantasy Pin – A pin commissioned or produced by Disney pin collectors that contains similarities to Disney pins, but has not been created or endorsed by Disney. These pins are not allowed to be traded with cast members, although collectors may trade for these pins amongst themselves. From time to time, Disney will produce a pin that is very similar to a fantasy pin.
FREE-D – Free-D stands for Fastened Rubber Element on a pin for Extra Dimension. Pins that feature Free-D elements sometimes have discoloring issues and extra precautions should be taken to make sure that the Free-D element is not dirtied.
GWP – A GWP (Gift with Purchase) pin is a bonus pin given to guests who buy at least $25 of pin merchandise in one transaction. The Disneyland Resort designates the first Sunday of every month GWP Sunday, and has two collections each year of six pins each. The pins are often traded as lanyard fodder, and as a result they are not valuable initially. Walt Disney World has promotions where GWPs are available for $1 each with a $30 purchase. Their current promotion involves surplus Mystery Machine Pins.
HHG – HHG, or the Hitchhiking Ghosts, are the most famous residents of the Haunted Mansion.
HM – HM denotes either a Haunted Mansion or Hidden Mickey pin depending on the context.
Jumbo Pins – Jumbo Pins are larger and often more intricately designed than a regular size pin; as such, the pins cost between US$20 and US$35. Featured Artist (Jumbo) Pins are currently released at DLR, while WDW released a monthly Jumbo Monorail Collection for 2008. Traditionally, Jumbo Pins were released monthly with an edition size of 750 and available for $25. Recently, Jumbo Pins have been sold in editions of 1000 for US$20 or, at the Disneyland Resort, in editions of 500 for US$35.
Limited Edition Pins – Limited Edition pins are just that - limited. This means there will be a finite number of pins manufactured and sold. The "back stamp" (the text on the back of a pin) on the pin will list the edition size. Sometimes, a Limited Edition pin will be individually numbered meaning it will be #XXX of XXXX (depending upon edition size).
Mickey's Mystery Pin Machine – Debuting at Mouse Gear in Epcot at WDW in late 2007, the machines were a modified Gravity Hill arcade machine that dispensed a pin regardless of outcome. The pins were part of small collections consisting of five pins each. Although the pins originally cost $5 and were distributed randomly, remaining pins were sold as GWP pins and the Machines have now been designated as inactive and removed.
Name Pins – Name Pins are pins that have a name engraved on them, and may not be traded with cast members.
Piece of History (POH) – A Piece of History pin from the 2005 set is considered to be one of the rarest series in Disney Pin Trading. Each pin contains a minuscule piece of a prop from a WDW attraction. The first pin in the series, the 20,000 Leagues Under the Sea pin with a sliver of a porthole, has sold for over $275 on eBay. The success of the series has led to a 2006 and 2008 set and a 2009 and 2010 set for Disneyland Resort.
Pin Traders Delight (PTD) - The Pin Trader Delight is an ice cream sundae that comes with a limited edition pin as a gift with purchase. This sundae is only available at the Ghirardelli Studio Store located in Hollywood, California. Each pin depicts the featured character eating an ice cream sundae and is highly sought after as typically they have an edition size between 300 and 750. Sundaes are limited to 2 per person provided that the gift pins for each sundae are not the same. 
Pin Trading Night (PTN) – Pin Trading Nights are monthly meetings of Disney Pin Traders at DLR, WDW, or Disneyland Paris resorts. The Pin Trading Team provides pin games and gives traders the opportunity to trade and socialize. Often, an LE pin is released to commemorate the occasion.
Pin With Purchase/Purchase With Purchase (PWP) - Similar to GWP. except that the pin is not a "gift" but must be purchased.  Typically for pins the pin price is $3.95 and a $30 purchase is required to qualify. At one time Cast Members occasionally allowed guests to combine multiple receipts (including those from Disney-owned restaurants at the resort) to reach the $30 requirement but as of 2016 this is no longer permitted; the pin must be purchased at the same time as the qualifying transaction.
Rack Pins – Rack pins, also called Open Edition (OE) or core pins, are pins introduced and sold until they are discontinued or retired. These pins are re-ordered for up to several consecutive years. The starting retail price for these pins is typically $6.95 (for a flat pin). Depending upon the number of features on the pin (such as pin-on-pin), the retail price will increase to either $8.95 or $10.95.  Some OE pins have a high secondary value, such as the Soda Pop Series pins which each go in the $20 range.
Retired Pins - Retired (or discontinued) pins are pins that are no longer in production. Disney periodically "retires" pins so they can introduce new pins.
RSP -The Random Selection Process is the method by which LE pins are distributed at the Pin Events. Each guest submits a form which has slots for the Limited Edition merchandise items offered. Each slot is filled in order based on pin availability. If 1000 forms were to be submitted and 50 forms had an LE 25 framed set in their first slot, the first 25 forms would be given the purchase, with the remaining 25 given the opportunity to purchase their second-slot pin. Typically, there are three rounds of the RSP process with the smaller editions being unavailable to purchase in a subsequent round. RSP forms only allow a style of pin to appear once on each RSP form so that there is a better, fairer chance of each person getting one pin.
Scrapper - An unauthorized Disney pin. These pins are literally scrap pins. Sometimes they are seconds from the factory runs, or sometimes they have errors in color, design, or the imprint on the back. Scrappers can also be the result of extra unauthorized production runs.  These pins often make it onto the secondary market where they are sold, often in lots, at much lower than market price. Scrapper pins can then be traded with cast members, as cast members do not decline a trade based on suspected scrapper status. Recent Hidden Mickey pins, DLR pins especially, have flooded the market months before their initial introductions.
Surprise or Mystery Pins - These pins usually feature a low-Limited Edition size. Typically, the back stamp will include the words "Surprise Pin".  The release of this pin happens randomly at various merchandise locations within the Disney Theme Parks and Resorts. Although Surprise pins have continued at the Disneyland Resort (as evidenced by their current Resort Sign set), WDW releases Surprise pins at PTNs rarely.

Popular themes
Because there are over 100,000 Disney Pins available, many themes and characters are collected:

 Characters
 Mickey Mouse universe
 Mickey Mouse
 Minnie Mouse
 Donald Duck
 Daisy Duck
 Goofy
 Pluto
 Chip 'n Dale
 Pinocchio
 Jiminy Cricket
 Winnie the Pooh
 Lilo & Stitch characters
 Stitch
 Lilo Pelekai
 Angel (Experiment 624)
 Roger Rabbit
 Jessica Rabbit
 Figment (primarily at WDW)
 Tinker Bell
 Films
 Aladdin
 Alice in Wonderland
 Cinderella
 Finding Nemo
 Beauty and the Beast
 Peter Pan
 Snow White and the Seven Dwarfs
 Song of the South
 Tangled
 The Jungle Book
 The Little Mermaid
 The Princess and the Frog
 Toy Story
 Attractions
 Space Mountain
 Big Thunder Mountain Railroad
 Splash Mountain
 Soarin'
 It's a Small World
 The Twilight Zone Tower of Terror
 Rock 'n' Roller Coaster starring Aerosmith
 The Haunted Mansion and the Hitchhiking Ghosts
 Pirates of the Caribbean
 Star Tours – The Adventures Continue
 Disneyland or Walt Disney World Monorail
 Series
 Cast lanyard (now known as Hidden Mickey series)
 Disney Auctions LE 100 (limited production run of only 100 pins)
 Piece of History Pins
 Soda Pop Series

Cast lanyard and Hidden Mickey pins
The WDW Cast Lanyard Collection was introduced in 1999 to encourage guests to trade pins with cast members. The first series of Lanyard pins consisted of just under 100 pins. Previews of the next year's Lanyard pins are at each September Event, with the pins officially distributed a few weeks later. "Disney's Cast Lanyard Collection" is on the back stamp of each pin in the first two series. Beginning with the third series, pin designers placed Hidden Mickeys on the pins after guests complained that it was difficult to discern Lanyard pins from the other pins on lanyards. In 2007, with the release of the fifth Lanyard series, the name of the series was officially changed to the Hidden Mickey Collection and a collection of 94 of the most popular earlier designs were reissued. When asked about the change the Pin Team responded, "The name change is based on the current identifier found on Hidden Mickey pins, a small Mickey Mouse icon. Those icons of Mickey Mouse, commonly referred to as a Hidden Mickey, are also incorporated into many attractions and locations at Disney Theme Parks and Resorts. We felt this change would complement something fun many guests were already seeking."

In 2007, the second WDW Hidden Mickey set was released as a collection of 75 new designs, followed by the third Hidden Mickey set in late 2008.

Disneyland Resort has had their own Lanyard Pin Series since 2002. DLR Lanyard Pin Collections have fewer styles than the WDW series, with most DLR series consisting of around 50 pins. Additionally, sets of 12 Hotel Lanyard Pins have been released biannually to DLR hotel guests who receive two pins at their time of check-in to trade. For the 2007 and 2008 Hidden Mickey Collections, pins have been released monthly by series. Scrappers of past DLR Hidden Mickey pins have appeared on the secondary market months before their official release dates. In an effort to combat this practice, designs for the 2008 and 2009 series, although previously shown at DLR Pin Trading Nights, have been released monthly.

Pin events
Pins have been available as merchandise at WDW and DLR hard ticket events since the late 1990s. After the Millennium Celebration, annual Pin Events were established to provide event-exclusive pins and opportunities for traders to socialize. The largest and most notable event is the September Event, held at Epcot annually. The 2008's event was Disney's Pin Celebration 2008 - Pin Trading University, which was held from September 5–7, 2008. Occasionally, special events are planned at the Walt Disney World Resort beyond the September Event. Expedition Pins allowed Pin Traders to take over Disney's Animal Kingdom after hours.

Disneyland Resort offers pin events as well, although not as frequently. Their "Camp Pin-e-ha-ha" event was well received, and the Disney Day Campin' Event on June 21 was part of their annual summer-long Pin Festival. 2008 saw Mickey's Pin Odyssey and in 2009 Disneyland hosted the Haunted Mansion O'Pin House. Both events featured weekly releases of themed pins. Next up was the Disney Summer Pin Festival 2010 - Dateline: Disneyland.

Disneyland Resort Paris also stages semiannual events including the DroPIN event to celebrate the opening of their Tower of Terror. All of the events feature pin games, exclusive pins and children's activities, and most have pin gifts to remember the event by. Each Resort also offers a monthly Pin Trading Nights with pin boards, games, and kid's areas.

Hong Kong Disneyland introduced its first Pin Trading Fun Day in 2007. The park continues to organize the pin event once a year during a weekend in the Easter holiday period. The event features activities such as "Magical Moment", "Surprise Moment" and other games. Also, a special limited edition pin box set will be released as well during the event.

Unofficial pin events take place regularly both inside and outside of the parks.

See also
Disneyana
Lapel pin
Pin trading
Vinylmation

References

External links
 Official website
 PinPics — A large enthusiast-run database of pins
 Disney Pin Trading: Innocent Hobby... or Obsession?
 Pin Trading Terms – A large collection of pin trading terms from the community

Collecting
Disney merchandise
1999 introductions